The Maine Army National Guard is a component of the United States Army and the United States National Guard.  Nationwide, the Army National Guard comprises approximately one half of the US Army's available combat forces and approximately one-third of its support organization.  National coordination of various state National Guard units are maintained through the National Guard Bureau. The Guard is administered by the adjutant general, an appointee of the governor of Maine. The Constitution of the United States specifically charges the National Guard with dual federal and state missions. Those functions range from limited actions during non-emergency situations to full-scale law enforcement of martial law when local law enforcement officials can no longer maintain civil control.

Maine's Army National Guard units are trained and equipped as part of the United States Army.  The same ranks (enlisted/officer) and insignia are used and National Guardsmen are eligible to receive all United States military awards. The Maine Guard also bestows a number of state awards for local services rendered in or to the state of Maine.

The current adjutant general for the Maine National Guard is Major General Douglas A. Farnham.

The Maine Army National Guard is composed of 48 units spread across approximately 29 armories and is present in 26 communities in Maine. The headquarters is located in Camp Chamberlain, Augusta, ME.

The larger units in the state specialize in:
 Engineering and construction - 133rd Engineer Battalion
 Aviation - Companies of the 142d & 126th Aviation Regiments

Smaller units specialties include:
 Military police
 Transportation and maintenance
 Infantry
 Headquarters related support units
 Full List of Units

In addition, it includes the 11th WMD Civil Support Team. The 11th WMD CST was of the first of the now 57 teams that are spread across the United States of America that is tasked with immediate (less than four-hour) response to any unknown chemical, biological, or radiological incident. The joint Army/Air Guard team can self-sustain for 72 hours of continuous operation and is constantly training to stay on top of the technology and techniques for sampling, evidence collection, identification, and education of the possibilities that the team may be alerted for.

History

The citizens of Maine have been defending their homes and families since the first colonists came ashore in the 1630s.  When Maine became part of Massachusetts in the 1670s they fought in the Massachusetts Militia during King Philip's War, Queen Anne's War, King George's War, and the War of the Spanish Succession, known in North America as the French and Indian War.  In 1775, Maine Soldiers rushed to the Battle of Bunker Hill and the siege of Boston.  Mainers would continue to serve through the end of the war.

Maine saw incursions from the British yet again during the War of 1812.  British forces threatened the city of Portland in 1814, having seized Bangor and Castine earlier that year. The citizens of Southern Maine appealed to the government of Massachusetts for aid, as Maine was still part of Massachusetts. The federal government also ordered Massachusetts Governor Caleb Strong to send troops to defend Maine. Governor Strong declined, as his politics differed from those of President Madison. He would leave Maine to the British.

This understandably outraged the citizens of Maine, who rallied their own militia for their defense. The commander of the militia, General Alfond Richardson, began preparations for the defense of the town of Portland in defiance of Governor Strong's orders, stating that even though he was only an officer of the militia, he was still a soldier of the United States and was bound under the Constitution to protect those under him. Forts Scammel and Preble were both manned with 200 troops and the batteries on those islands were reinforced. In addition, batteries and redoubts were built on the landward side of town to protect from an invasion overland. The Portland Light Infantry Company manned the forts in the harbor from September through October, but following the failed British assaults on New York, Maryland and Louisiana launched from Canada, major offensives effectively ended altogether and no defense of southern Maine was necessary. Formed in 1803 in Portland, the company is the longest serving unit in the Maine Army National Guard.

Due to the actions of Major General Richardson and the men of the Maine Division of Militia, the British decided that the fortifications around Portland were too strong and cancelled the attack.  However, the implications of this event carried over into the political realm in a major way.  The District of Maine, which had been dissatisfied with the government of Massachusetts since its annexation in the 1600s, now had enough with being a part of a state that would abandon it to the British.  The actions of Major General Richardson propelled the push for Maine's statehood, which would occur six years later in 1820.

The Maine National Guard was officially established in 1820 as a State Militia, when Maine entered the Union (as a result of the Missouri Compromise). Forty years later, more than 72,000 Soldiers from Maine fought to preserve the Union during the Civil War (1861–65).

For much of the final decades of the twentieth century, National Guard personnel typically served "One weekend a month, two weeks a year", with a portion working for the Guard in a full-time capacity.  The current forces formation plans of the US Army call for the typical National Guard unit (or National Guardsman) to serve one year of active duty for every three years of service.  More specifically, current Department of Defense policy is that no Guardsman will be involuntarily activated for a total of more than 24 months (cumulative) in one six-year enlistment period (this policy is due to change 1 August 2007, the new policy states that Soldiers will be given 24 months between deployments of no more than 24 months, individual states have differing policies).

Since its establishment, soldiers from the Maine Army National Guard have served in every military conflict, either in a support role, or active theater operations.

According to a 2 March 2013 article in the Economist, "No state has lost more soldiers in Afghanistan, per person, than Maine—a fertile recruiting ground in every conflict since the civil war and still today home to an unusual number of veterans."

Historic units
  103rd Infantry Regiment
 20th Maine Infantry Regiment
 Maine National Guard units in the Civil War

Current Units

Structure:
 Augusta
 Joint Forces Headquarters
 Training Site Detachment
 121st Public Affairs Detachment
 240th Regiment (Regional Training Institute)
 Drug Demand Reduction Counter | Drug Task Force
 Recruiting and Retention
 Medical Detachment
 1968th Contingency Contracting Team
 52nd Troop Command
 152nd Maintenance Company (-) (CRC)
 Bangor
 Detachment 14 - OSACOM
 120th Regional Support Group
Headquarters and Headquarters Detachment
 521st Troop Command
 195th Army Band
 1st Battalion (Security & Support), 224th Aviation Regiment
 1st Battalion (General Support), 126th Aviation Regiment
 Headquarters and Headquarters Company 
 Detachment 2
 Company C
 Company D 
Detachment 2
 Company E 
Detachment 2
 3rd Battalion, 142nd Aviation Regiment
Headquarters and Headquarters Company
 Detachment 2
 Company C 
 Detachment 1
 Company D 
 Detachment 2
 Company E 
 Detachment 2
 1136th Transportation Company (-)
 152nd Maintenance Company (Detachment 1)
 286th Combat Service Support Battalion
Headquarters and Headquarter Company
 Belfast
 Pending Unit Assignment
 Brewer
 Company B, 3rd Battalion, 172nd Infantry Regiment (Mountain)
 Headquarters & Headquarters Company (Detachment 1), 3rd Battalion, 172nd Infantry Regiment (Mountain)
 Company E (Detachment 1), 186th Brigade Support Battalion, 86th Infantry Brigade Combat Team (Mountain) (supports 3-172nd Infantry Regiment)
 Calais
 1136th Transportation Company (Detachment 2)
 Caribou
 HQ 185th Engineer Company (Support)
 Brunswick
 133rd Engineer Battalion
Headquarters and Headquarters Company
Forward Support Company
 Houlton
 185th Engineer Company, Detachment 1 (Support)
 Lewiston
 136th Engineer Company, Detachment 1 (Vertical)
 Norway
 251st Engineer Company (Sapper)
 Sanford
 262nd Engineer Company, Detachment 1 (Horizontal)
 Skowhegan
 136th Engineer Company, Headquarters (Vertical)
 Waterville
 11th Civil Support Team (Weapons of Mass Destruction)
 488th Military Police Company
 Westbrook
 HQ 262nd Engineer Company (Horizontal)

See also
Maine State Guard

References

External links
GlobalSecurity.org Maine Army National Guard
Official website

United States Army National Guard by state
Military in Maine